Kipabiskau is a hamlet in Rural Municipality of Pleasantdale No. 398, Saskatchewan, Canada. It previously held the status of a village until April 30, 1973.

Demographics 
Prior to April 30, 1973, Kipabiskau was incorporated as a village, and was restructured as a hamlet under the jurisdiction of the RM of Pleasantdale on that date.

See also 
List of communities in Saskatchewan
Hamlets of Saskatchewan

References

External links 

Pleasantdale No. 398, Saskatchewan
Former villages in Saskatchewan
Unincorporated communities in Saskatchewan
Populated places disestablished in 1973